Wacław Łapkowski (6 November 1913 in Dyneburg – 2 July 1941 over the English Channel) was a major in the Polish Air Force and fighter ace  during World War II, with 6 confirmed kills and one shared.

Biography
Łapkowski graduated from Polish Air Force Academy in Dęblin in 1934. On 15 August 1934 he was named second lieutenant (podporucznik) and assigned to the Polish 112th Fighter Escadrille. During the Invasion of Poland, on 6 September 1939 he took command of his unit after Stefan Okrzeja died. On 9 September he shot down a He 111. After the September Campaign he was evacuated to France where he was posted to the Opulski section in Romorantin. After the Battle of France, Łapkowski arrived in the UK. On 3 August 1940, he was ordered to the No. 303 Polish Fighter Squadron and took part in the Battle of Britain. On 5 September he downed a Ju 88 but his plane was damaged, Łapkowski wounded, jumped with a parachute. On 5 May 1941, he became commander of his squadron. On 2 July 1941, No. 303, engaged some 60 Bf 109s over Lille. Łapkowski was killed over the English Channel. His body washed up onshore.

Łapkowski was buried in Lombardsijde, Belgium.

Aerial victory credits
 1/3 He 111 - 6 September 1939
 He 111 - 9 September 1939
 Ju 88 - 5 September 1940
 Bf 109 - 4 June 1941 (damaged)
 Bf 109 - 18 June 1941
 2 x Bf 109 - 22 June 1941 
 Bf 109 - 24 June 1941

Awards
 Virtuti Militari, Silver Cross 
 Cross of Valour (Poland), four times

References

Further reading
 
  
 
 
 Tadeusz Jerzy Krzystek, Anna Krzystek: Polskie Siły Powietrzne w Wielkiej Brytanii w latach 1940-1947 łącznie z Pomocniczą Lotniczą Służbą Kobiet (PLSK-WAAF). Sandomierz: Stratus, 2012, s. 352. 
 Jerzy Pawlak: Absolwenci Szkoły Orląt: 1925-1939. Warszawa: Retro-Art, 2009, s. 143. 
 Piotr Sikora: Asy polskiego lotnictwa. Warszawa: Oficyna Wydawnicza Alma-Press. 2014, s. 304-308. 
 
 Józef Zieliński: Lotnicy polscy w Bitwie o Wielką Brytanię. Warszawa: Oficyna Wydawnicza MH, 2005, s. 111-112. 

The Few
Polish World War II flying aces
Recipients of the Silver Cross of the Virtuti Militari
Recipients of the Cross of Valour (Poland)
1941 deaths
1913 births
Polish military personnel killed in World War II
Military personnel from Daugavpils
Polish Royal Air Force pilots of World War II